Pete William Delkus is the Chief Meteorologist at Tegna-owned and ABC-affiliated WFAA-TV in Dallas, Texas, United States.

Career
Delkus joined WFAA-TV in June 2005.  He has both the American Meteorological Society and the National Weather Association seals of approval. He attended Mississippi State University for his master's-level meteorology courses, and holds a Bachelor of Science in TV, Radio, and Film from Southern Illinois University Edwardsville (SIUE).  While at WFAA, he has won nineteen Emmy Awards for "Outstanding Weather Anchor", "Outstanding Weathercast", "Outstanding Host of a News Special" and "Outstanding Host of Special Event Coverage - Big D NYE". He has also been awarded four times by the Associated Press, First Place winner of "Best Weathercast" in Texas.

From 1996 to 2005, Delkus was the chief meteorologist at WCPO-TV, the ABC affiliate in Cincinnati, Ohio. While there, he received a pair of first place Associated Press Awards for best regularly scheduled weather. Prior to joining WCPO-TV, Delkus worked as a meteorologist for four years at WFTV, the ABC affiliate in Orlando, Florida.

Delkus also has a long history as an outstanding athlete. As an All-America pitcher, he had an all-star college career including a trip to the College World Series. He still holds several records as a pitcher at SIUE. Out of college, Delkus signed as a Free Agent in 1987 with the Minnesota Twins organization. In 1988, while pitching for the double A Kenosha, Wisconsin, team, Delkus finished the season with 33 saves and a 0.26 ERA. The following year in triple A Orlando, Delkus played 140 innings and saved 10 games with a 1.87 ERA.   Again, Delkus enjoyed a successful career, earning the "Minnesota Twins Minor League Player of the Year" and the Rolaids Relief Man awards.  His career ended prematurely due to a serious elbow injury. In all, Delkus played professional baseball for parts of six years with the Minnesota Twins organization.
 
Delkus currently lives in the Dallas suburb Plano, Texas, with his wife and two children.

References

External links
Delkus Delivers
Pete Delkus biography – WFAA
Peter Delkus baseball statistics – www.thebaseballcube.com

American television meteorologists
1965 births
Living people
Mississippi State University aircraft
Southern Illinois University Edwardsville alumni